Prostanthera askania, commonly known as tranquility mintbush,  is a shrub that is endemic to  Australia. It has mostly pale mauve flowers, strongly scented leaves and branches, dull green, toothed egg-shaped leaves and a restricted distribution.

Description
Flowering occurs from June to December.

Taxonomy and naming
Prostanthera askania was first formally described in 1997 by Barry Conn and the description was published in Telopea. The specific epithet askania is named after Askania Park a private reserve west of Ourimbah, where it grows in sheltered gullies.

Distribution and habitat
Tranquility mint bush has a restricted distribution near creeks that flow into Brisbane Water or Tuggerah Lake near Gosford in New South Wales. It grows as an understory shrub near rainforest on flats to reasonably steep slopes in sandstone and alluvial soils.

Conservation status
Prostanthera askania is listed as "endangered" under the Australian Government Environment Protection and Biodiversity Conservation Act 1999 and the New South Wales Government Biodiversity Conservation Act 2016.

References

askania
Flora of New South Wales
Lamiales of Australia
Plants described in 1997
Taxa named by Barry John Conn